USS Cross (DE-448) was a John C. Butler-class destroyer escort in service with the United States Navy from 1945 to 1946 and from 1951 to 1958. She was sold for scrapping in 1968.

Namesake
Frederick Gushing Cross, Jr. was born on 8 July 1917 in Lunenburg, Massachusetts. He enlisted in the United States Naval Reserve on 22 March 1941, and after aviation training was ordered to a bombing squadron at Naval Air Station DeLand, Florida. Lieutenant (junior grade) Cross was killed in action on 7 August 1943 during an engagement with an enemy submarine. Although he was mortally wounded and his plane had a shattered starboard engine, he continued to attack the submarine, then made a perfect water landing, thus saving the lives of his copilot and radio operator. He was posthumously awarded the Navy Cross.

History
Cross was launched 4 July 1944 by Federal Shipbuilding and Dry Dock Co., Kearny, New Jersey; sponsored by Mrs. D. F. Cross, mother of the late Lieutenant (junior grade) Cross, USNR; and commissioned 8 January 1945.

Pacific War 
Departing New York 22 March 1945, Cross called at San Diego, California, before arriving at Pearl Harbor for additional training. She sailed on 8 May escorting a convoy for Ulithi, and from 29 May to 11 September Cross continued to escort vital supply-laden convoys from Ulithi to Okinawa. After repairs at Okinawa, she called at San Diego and Boston, Massachusetts, then put in at Green Cove Springs, Florida, where she was placed out of commission in reserve 14 June 1946.

Training ship 
Recommissioned 6 June 1951, Cross was assigned to the 1st Naval District to serve as a training ship for New England Naval Reservists. She remained in this employment until placed in reserve again 2 January 1958. She was struck from the Navy list on 1 July 1966, and, on 5 March 1968, she was sold for scrapping.

Military awards 

Cross was awarded one battle star for World War II service.

References

External links 

 

John C. Butler-class destroyer escorts
World War II frigates and destroyer escorts of the United States
Ships built in Kearny, New Jersey
1944 ships